Speiredonia gowa is a species of moth of the family Erebidae first described by Alberto Zilli and Jeremy Daniel Holloway in 2005. It is found in the northern Moluccas and Sulawesi.

The length of the forewings is 24-24.5 mm for males.

External links
 

Moths described in 2005
Speiredonia